Vikingarännet, (The Viking Run), is a long distance ice skating race and tour skating event between Uppsala and Stockholm in Sweden. The race length is about 80 km. There is also a
shorter 50 km event called Vikingaturen.

Name
The event is named because it follows historical water transportation routes on Lake Mälaren which have been used since the so-called Viking times, ca 1000 CE.

History
The first race was in 1999 when about 4000 skaters participated. The event had to be cancelled in 2000 and 2002 due to poor ice conditions on the planned race date, and again in 2008 due to nearly complete absence of ice all through the winter along the planned route. Beginning in 2003, the race date is only set a few weeks beforehand, depending on short term predictions of ice conditions.

Beginning in 2006 most of the 80 km course, called Vikingaslingan, was kept ploughed for the entire three-month skating season, not just for the race event.

List of winners
 1999 - Hotze Zandstra - Netherlands 2:35:42)
 2000 - Race not held
 2001 - Martijn Kromkamp - Netherlands (2:58:10)
 2002 - Race not held
 2003 - Johan Håmås - Sweden (3:09:00)
 2004 - Johan Håmås - Sweden (2:57:02
 2005 - Johan Håmås - Sweden (2:44:07)
 2006 - Johan Håmås - Sweden (2:45:08)
 2007 - Johan Håmås - Sweden (2:40:01)
 2008 - Race not held
 2009 - Johan Håmås - Sweden (2:40:32)
 2010 - Sonny Peterson - Sweden (2:57:46)
 2011 - Matt X. Richardson - Sweden (2:51:57)
 2012 - Jan Maarten Heideman - Netherlands (3:02:35)
 2013 - Erben Wennemars - Netherlands (2:35:52)
 2014 - Race not held
 2015 - Race not held
 2016 - ?
 2017 - Race not held
 2018 - Race not held

See also
List of sporting events in Sweden

References

External links 
 http://www.vikingarannet.se/en/ Official site in English
 http://xray.bmc.uu.se/~alasdair/sport/ice/SKATING/vikingarannet/index.html Description of 2003 event

Ice skating in Sweden
1999 establishments in Sweden
February sporting events
Recurring sporting events established in 1999
Winter sports competitions in Sweden